Saint-Cyr-au-Mont-d'Or is a commune in the Metropolis of Lyon in Auvergne-Rhône-Alpes region in eastern France. It is one of the richest communities in the Lyon metropolis with a median household income of 89,819€ per year.

Population

See also
Communes of the Metropolis of Lyon

References

Communes of Lyon Metropolis
Lyonnais